The Roman Catholic Diocese of Port-Vila (Latin: Dioecesis Portus Vilensis; French: Diocèse de Port-Vila) in Vanuatu is  a suffragan diocese of the Roman Catholic Archdiocese of Nouméa.

History
The first Catholic mission in Vanuatu was started in 1887 at Mele on Efate, by the Marist Father Le Forestier S.M., three other Marist priests and a brother. The greatest growth of Catholic converts took place in the North, where the French influence was strong. This was especially true in Espiritu Santo and Malekula.

In 1901 it was first erected as the Prefecture Apostolic of New Hebrides, with the Right Reverend Victor Douceré S.M. as apostolic prefect. In 1904 it became a Vicariate Apostolic. In 1966, it was elevated as the Diocese of Port-Vila.

Tropical Cyclone Pam, of March 2015, was the second most intense tropical cyclone of the south Pacific Ocean in terms of sustained winds and is regarded as one of the worst natural disasters in the history of Vanuatu. Bishop John Bosco Baremes SM, worked with the Diocesan Disaster Committee and Caritas to identify and address key needs such as shelter, food, clean water, and protection of the poor and vulnerable.

Ordinaries
 Isidore-Marie-Victor Douceré, S. M. (1901–1939) 
Jules Halbert, S. M. (1939–1954) 
Louis-Jean-Baptiste-Joseph Julliard, S. M. (1955–1976) 
Francis-Roland Lambert, S. M. (1976–1996) 
Michel Visi (1996 – May 19, 2007)
Jean Bosco Baremes S. M. (November 18, 2009 – present)

See also
 Catholic Church in Vanuatu

References

External links and references
Pacific News: Vanuatu Bishop Michel Visi Dies Aged 52

Roman Catholic dioceses in Vanuatu
Catholic Church in Vanuatu
Port-Vila
1901 establishments in Oceania